Montgomery House in Madison, Mississippi is a picturesque one-story Gothic Revival house that was built in c. 1852.  It was listed on the National Register of Historic Places in 1984.

Its design is attributed to British-born architect Frank Wills, who is known for his designs of Gothic Revival churches.  Wills designed the Chapel of the Cross in Madison which was built during 1850–52.

References

Carpenter Gothic architecture in Mississippi
Houses completed in 1852
Houses on the National Register of Historic Places in Mississippi
Houses in Madison County, Mississippi
National Register of Historic Places in Madison County, Mississippi
1852 establishments in Mississippi